Gary Burns (born 1960) is a Canadian film writer and director. Burns studied drama at the University of Calgary before attending Concordia University, where he graduated in 1992 from the Fine Arts film program.

Born in Calgary, Alberta, many of Burns' films are shot in Calgary, and contain references to the particularities of living in the city. The Plus 15 system becomes the habitrail of urban semi-professionals in waydowntown and the public transportation system becomes a node where lives intersect in The Suburbanators. Radiant City examines the seemingly endless amount of suburban neighbourhoods that has overtaken Calgary.

Burns is an alumnus of the University of Calgary's television program.

Film festival acceptance
His works have been very well received at Canadian film festivals. His first feature film, The Suburbanators, debuted at the 1995 Toronto International Film Festival, where it placed in the top ten Canadian films and was also invited to the Sundance film festival in 1996. It is a comedy/road movie about bored suburban slackers in Calgary.

At the 1997 Vancouver International Film Festival, he was awarded Best Emerging Director for Kitchen Party, a "teenage house party gone wrong" comedy. His film waydowntown was given the Best Canadian Feature prize at the 2000 Toronto International Film Festival. His 2006 film, Radiant City, co-directed with Jim Brown, garnered the Special Jury Prize at the Vancouver International Film Festival.

Filmography
 The Suburbanators - 1995
 Kitchen Party - 1997
 Fuck Coke - 1999
 waydowntown - 2000
 A Problem with Fear - 2003
 Radiant City - 2006
 The Future Is Now! - 2010
 Man Running - 2018

References

External links
 

1960 births
Canadian male screenwriters
Film directors from Calgary
Writers from Calgary
Living people
University of Calgary alumni
Concordia University alumni
Directors of Genie and Canadian Screen Award winners for Best Documentary Film
Date of birth missing (living people)